Francolino is a frazionevillage or suburbof Ferrara, Italy.

It was sometimes previously known as Francolini.

References

Citations

Bibliography
 .

Frazioni of Emilia-Romagna